George William Beldam (1 May 1868 – 23 November 1937) was an English first-class cricketer and a pioneer of action photography in sport.

George Beldam was the eldest child of a family that was descended from seventeenth-century Huguenot refugees. He studied engineering at Peterhouse, Cambridge, before joining the family engineering company. He captained Peterhouse at cricket, football and tennis, and later played for Brentford F.C.

He was a steady right-handed batsman and a right-arm bowler who represented Middlesex, Marylebone Cricket Club (MCC) and London County in first-class cricket between 1900 and 1907. He scored 6,575 runs (average 30.02) with a personal best of 155* against Surrey at Lord's in 1902 and took 83 catches and 107 wickets (average 30.63) with a personal best of 5/28 versus Lancashire at Liverpool in 1902.

He became a noted artist and photographer. He was the first action photographer of sport in Britain, specialising in cricket and golf. He collaborated with C.B. Fry on two instructional books, Beldam providing the illustrations and some of the text:

 Great Batsmen: Their Methods at a Glance (1905)
 Great Bowlers and Fielders: Their Methods at a Glance (1907)

His brother, Cyril Beldam, and a cousin, Ernest Beldam, also played first-class cricket.

Beldam was a member of the committee that built and opened London's first public golf courses in Richmond Park, which were opened in 1923 and 1925.

A biography of him was written by a descendant:

 George Alastair Beldam, Third Man in: Lost World of a Camera Artist – G.W.Beldam and the Art of Edwardian Cricket, The George Beldam Collection, 1995, 

Beldam married three times. He left his first wife, Gertrude, and married the much younger Margaret Underwood in 1921, then in turn left Margaret and married the even younger Christina in 1930. All three marriages produced children. He and Christina lived on 24 acres near Farnham in Surrey. He died of a heart attack in 1937. His son by his second marriage, Roy Beldam (1925–2020), became a barrister and a High Court judge.

References

Cited sources
 Gideon Haigh (2016) Stroke of Genius: Victor Trumper and the Shot that Changed Cricket, Hamish Hamilton, Melbourne, .

External links
 
 Cricinfo profile
 CricketArchive profile
 Wisden obituary

1868 births
1937 deaths
English cricketers
Photographers from Kent
Middlesex cricketers
Brentford F.C. players
Cricketers from Greater London
Footballers from New Cross
Alumni of Peterhouse, Cambridge
Sports photographers
Gentlemen of the South cricketers
London County cricketers
Marylebone Cricket Club cricketers
Gentlemen cricketers
North v South cricketers
Gentlemen of England cricketers
Association footballers not categorized by position
English footballers
A. J. Webbe's XI cricketers